Budge Budge College, established in 1971, is an undergraduate college in Budge Budge, West Bengal, India. It is affiliated with the University of Calcutta.

Departments

Science

Chemistry
Physics
Mathematics
Botany
Zoology

Arts and Commerce

Bengali
English
Education
History
Geography
Political Science
Philosophy
Economics
Commerce

Accreditation
Budge Budge College is recognized by the University Grants Commission (UGC). It was accredited by the National Assessment and Accreditation Council (NAAC), and awarded B grade, an accreditation that has since then expired.

See also 
List of colleges affiliated to the University of Calcutta
Education in India
Education in West Bengal

References

External links
Budge Budge College

Educational institutions established in 1971
University of Calcutta affiliates
Universities and colleges in South 24 Parganas district
1971 establishments in West Bengal